Michigan's 41st House of Representatives district (also referred to as Michigan's 41st House district) is a legislative district within the Michigan House of Representatives located in 
part of Kalamazoo County. The district was created in 1965, when the Michigan House of Representatives district naming scheme changed from a county-based system to a numerical one.

List of representatives

Recent Elections

Historical district boundaries

References 

Michigan House of Representatives districts
Oakland County, Michigan